Donald Clyde Taylor is an American former professional baseball pitcher. He coached baseball at Bishop McDevitt High School in Glenside, PA for several years after retiring.

Sources
, or Retrosheet, or Pura Pelota (Venezuelan Winter League)

1958 births
Living people
African-American baseball players
Alexandria Dukes players
American expatriate baseball players in Canada
Baltimore Orioles players
Baseball players from Pennsylvania
Buffalo Bisons (minor league) players
Greenwood Pirates players
Harrisburg Senators players
Hawaii Islanders players
Major League Baseball pitchers
Nashua Pirates players
Navegantes del Magallanes players
American expatriate baseball players in Venezuela
People from Abington Township, Montgomery County, Pennsylvania
Pfeiffer Falcons baseball players
Pittsburgh Pirates players
Prince William Pirates players
Vancouver Canadians players
21st-century African-American people
20th-century African-American sportspeople
High school baseball coaches in the United States